A hole in one is a golf shot where a player hits the ball directly from the tee into the cup with one shot.

Hole in one may also refer to:

 A Hole in One, a 2004 film with Michelle Williams and Meat Loaf, set in the 1950s with lobotomy in the plot
 Hole in One (2010 film), a 2010 comedy film with golf in the plot
 "Hole in One" (Only Fools and Horses), an episode of BBC sitcom Only Fools and Horses
 "Hole in One" (The Price Is Right), a segment game from the American TV series The Price Is Right
 "Hole in One", a song by Gotthard from the album G.